A fretless bass is a bass guitar whose neck does not have any frets. While the instrument is played in all styles of music, it is most common in pop, rock, and jazz. It first saw widespread use during the 1970s, although some players used them before then.

Instead of being invented by an instrument manufacturer, the first fretless basses usually resulted from modifications made by bass guitar players. One of the first (if not the first) examples of this is Rolling Stones bassist Bill Wyman, who removed the frets from his bass guitar in 1961 to fix a fret buzz issue. The first fretless bass to be produced by a designated company is the Ampeg AUB1, first released in 1965.

Characteristics

The lack of frets allows for more fluid slides between notes, but also requires greater precision by the player, as the instrument may sound out of tune if notes are not fretted accurately. Like fretted bass guitars, they can have four, five, six, or even more strings. While some have "fret lines" indicating where the players should place their fingers for correct intonation, other basses may have only inlay dots or nothing at all on the fingerboard. While many fretless players use flatwound strings as they are believed to not wear down on the neck as much as roundwounds, some players, such as Jaco Pastorius, are mainly known for using roundwound strings to gain a brighter tone.

Notable players

Jack Bruce
Boz Burrell
Les Claypool
Rick Danko
Steve Di Giorgio
Tony Franklin
Dan 'Freebo' Freidberg
David Gilmour
Mick Karn
Bakithi Kumalo
John McVie
Pino Palladino
Jaco Pastorius
John Paul Jones
Stanley Sheldon
Sting
Roger Waters
Bill Wyman

References

Guitar parts and accessories
Bass guitars